Dorothea of Bulgaria (died  1390), also called Doroslava, was the first Queen of Bosnia. Daughter of the Bulgarian tsar Ivan Sratsimir, Dorothea was held hostage by King Louis I of Hungary, who married her off to Ban Tvrtko I of Bosnia in 1374. She became queen in 1377 and may have been the mother of King Tvrtko II.

Captivity 

Dorothea was the daughter of Ivan Sratsimir, Tsar of Bulgaria. Her mother was Ivan Sratsimir's first cousin and second wife, Anna of Wallachia. Dorothea was captured along with her parents and sister in 1365 by the army of King Louis I of Hungary following his conquest of Ivan Sratsimir's capital city, Vidin. The family was held captive in Humnik Fortress in Bosiljevo, Croatia.  spent four years in the fortress, and were forced to convert from Bulgarian Orthodoxy to Roman Catholicism.

Ivan Sratsimir was released and restored as Louis's vassal in 1369, but Louis retained Dorothea and her sister at the Hungarian court as honored hostages to ensure their father's loyalty. Dorothea was placed in care of the queen, Elizabeth of Bosnia, and queen mother, Elizabeth of Poland. According to Mavro Orbini, Dorothea was a lady-in-waiting to the Hungarian queen. While her sister died in childhood, Dorothea fell in favour of the King.

Queenship 
Ban Tvrtko I of Bosnia, another vassal of King Louis, probably first heard about Dorothea during her captivity in Croatia. Louis eventually suggested that Tvrtko marry her. The negotiations were carried out by Louis on Dorothea's behalf. The marriage that made Dorothea Banness of Bosnia was celebrated in Hungarian-held Syrmia in early December 1374, either in Đakovo or in Ilinci; the wedding festivities doubtlessly took place in Ilinci.

In October 1377, Tvrtko was crowned King of Bosnia and Dorothea became the country's first queen. As such, Dorothea was consulted in state affairs. She witnessed her husband's charters and took oaths to respect them, initially alongside her mother-in-law, Jelena Šubić. Queen Dorothea is mentioned in a 1382 charter to the Republic of Ragusa alongside the King and the King's son, presumably her son too. This child may have been the future King Tvrtko II.

Queen Dorothea died shortly before 1390, when her husband was negotiating a remarriage into the House of Habsburg.

References

Bibliography

 
 

 
 
 
 

|-

Bosnian queens
14th-century births
1390 deaths
14th-century Bulgarian people
14th-century Bulgarian women
Bulgarian princesses
Kotromanić dynasty
Sratsimir dynasty
People from Vidin
Tsardom of Vidin
Year of death uncertain
Year of birth missing
Daughters of emperors
Hungarian ladies-in-waiting